Junius Conyers Matthews (June 12, 1890 – January 18, 1978) was an American actor in films, theater, radio and television. He was the voice of Archimedes the Owl in Disney's The Sword in the Stone in 1963. He was also the original voice of Rabbit in the Winnie the Pooh franchise from 1966 to 1977.

Career 
Matthews began his acting career on Broadway in shows like Young Wisdom (1914) and Any House (1916) before he got his first role in a silent film called The Silent Witness (1917). He briefly stopped performing while serving as a private in World War I. Over the course of the 1920s he alternated between stage and radio productions. He later played the role of the Tin Woodsman on a radio version of The Wizard of Oz. His distinctive voice can be frequently heard in supporting roles in radio, particularly westerns where he was often cast as an old codger, miner, or master of the cook wagon. Matthews appeared on the short-lived series Luke Slaughter of Tombstone as Slaughter's sidekick, Wichita, and played Ling Wee, a Chinese waiter, in Gasoline Alley. He also made guest appearances on several television series in the 1950s and 1960s.

Winnie the Pooh 
It was not until the last ten years of his life that Matthews became widely known for his role as Rabbit in the Winnie the Pooh movies produced by the Disney studio from 1966 to 1977, including the featurettes Winnie the Pooh and the Honey Tree (1966), Winnie the Pooh and the Blustery Day (1968), and Winnie the Pooh and Tigger Too! (1974) as well as the feature-length compilation film The Many Adventures of Winnie the Pooh (1977). He played other roles for Disney, most notably the owl, Archimedes, in Disney's The Sword in the Stone (1963). After his death in 1978, first Will Ryan and then Ken Sansom took over the role as the voice of Rabbit.

Death 
Matthews died on January 18, 1978, at age 87 and was buried in Forest Lawn – Hollywood Hills Cemetery.

Filmography

References

External links 
 

1890 births
1978 deaths
20th-century American male actors
American military personnel of World War I
American male film actors
American male radio actors
American male television actors
American male voice actors
Burials at Forest Lawn Memorial Park (Hollywood Hills)
Male actors from Chicago
United States Army soldiers